The N2 or National Highway 2 is a national highway in Ghana that begins at the Tema Motorway interchange at Tema and runs through Hohoe, Nkwanta, Yendi, and Bawku to the border with Burkina Faso at Kulungugu. The route runs through the Greater Accra, Eastern, Volta, Oti, Northern, North East Region and Upper East regions of Ghana.

The route links the N1 to the N10.

Route
Major towns and cities along the route of the N2 include Tema, Kpong, Atimpoku, Ho, Hohoe, Nkwanta, Bimbila, Gushiegu, Nakpanduri, Yendi, Bawku.

Greater Accra Region
The N2 begins at the Tema Motorway interchange where it intersects the N1 as the continuation of the Harbour Road which travels from the Tema Harbour northwards. There has been major upgrade works completed in 2020 converting the roundabout at the end of the Accra-Tema motorway to improve the traffic flow at this very busy junction of the N1 and N2. The N1 is forms part of the Trans-Africa Highway. It then proceeds north through the town of Afienya and runs by the western side of the Shai Hills Resource Reserve before entering the Eastern region.

Eastern Region
In the Eastern region, the route runs north through Kpong where it shares a junction with the N3 and then on to Atimpoku and Senchi before it traverses the Volta Lake via the Adomi Bridge. It then continues through the Adomi village before entering the Volta Region.

Volta Region
In the Volta Region, the N2 runs through Adomi, where it intersects with the N5 before continuing north. The route briefly crosses back into the Eastern region before re-entering the Volta Region after Asikuma. The N2 continues through Peki, Kpeve and Have-Etoe, where it intersects with the R26. It then turns slightly northeast through Fume, where it intersects with the R28, then runs north through Golokwati to intersect with the IR7. Continuing north, the N2 travels through Hohoe, intersecting the R10 before entering the Oti Region.

Oti Region
From Jasikan, the N2 intersects with the R23, then on to Kadjebi, where it intersects the R25, and Nkwanta, where it intersects with the R27, before veering northwest to Domanko, where it exits into the Northern region.

Northern Region
In the Northern Region, the N2 runs north through Nakpayili, where it intersects with the R202, continues northeast through Bimbila, where it intersects with the R29. The route continues northwest to Pusuga, before continuing north to Yendi  where it intersects with the N9. The N2 intersects with the R201 and R204 at Yendi as well. From Yendi, the N2 continues north to Sakpeigu, where it intersects with the N14, runs north through Gushiegu, where it intersects with the R107 and R110.

North East Region
The N2 heads north out of the Northern Region to Nakpanduri in the North East Region, where it intersects with the IR11 before entering the Upper East region.

Upper East Region
In the Upper East Region, the N2 runs north through Garu and Bawku, where it intersects with the N11 before continuing on to Kulungugu on the border with Burkina Faso.

See also 
Ghana Road Network

References

Roads in Ghana